Walid Ferhah (born 4 May 1992) is an Algerian club thrower. In his Paralympic Games debut, Ferhah won a bronze medal in the men's club throwing event.

References

1992 births
Living people
Paralympic athletes of Algeria
Athletes (track and field) at the 2020 Summer Paralympics
Paralympic bronze medalists for Algeria
Medalists at the 2020 Summer Paralympics
Paralympic medalists in athletics (track and field)
21st-century Algerian people